Takács is a Hungarian language occupational surname. It comes from Hungarian "takács" ("weaver"), which is derived from Slavic *tъkačь. Spelling variants include Takacs, Takach, Takats, and Takac. The name may refer to:

Ákos Takács (born 1982), Hungarian football player
Albert Takács (born 1955), Hungarian politician and jurist
Andre DeTakacs (1880–1919), Hungarian-American illustrator
Basil Takach (1879–1948), American bishop
Bogi Takács (born 1983), Hungarian writer
Dusmáta Takács (born 1986), Hungarian handball player
Fruzsina Takács (born 1992), Hungarian handball player
Gábor Takács (born 1959), Hungarian sprint canoeist
Gábor Takács-Nagy (born 1956), Hungarian violinist and conductor
George Takach (born 1957), Canadian lawyer
Gyula Takács (1914–2007), Hungarian field handball player
Jenő Takács (1902–2005), Hungarian-born Austrian composer
József Takács (1904–1983), Hungarian football player
József Takács (politician) (1884–1961), Hungarian politician
Károly Takács (1910–1976), Hungarian shooter
Krisztián Takács (born 1985), Hungarian swimmer
Laco Takács (born 1996), Czech football player
Lajos Takács (born 1924), Hungarian mathematician
Gyula Takács (born 1985), Hungarian radiologic technologist
Marcell Takács (born 1989), Hungarian football player
Miklós Takács (1906–1967), Hungarian politician
Orsolya Takács (born 1985), Hungarian water polo player
Péter Takács (footballer) (born 1990), Hungarian football player
Péter Takács (fencer born 1956), Hungarian fencer
Péter Takács (fencer born 1973), Hungarian fencer
Rareș Takács (born 1991), Romanian football player
Robby Takac (born 1964), American musician
Sándor Takács (1893–1932), Hungarian chess master
Sándor Takács (handballer) (born 1947), Hungarian handball player
Silvester Takač (born 1940), Serbian football player
 Tamás Takács (footballer, born 1979)
 Tamás Takács (footballer, born 1991)
 Tamás Takács (swimmer)
Tibor Takács (director) (born 1954), Hungarian director
Tibor Takács (canoeist), Hungarian sprint canoeist
William Takacs (born 1973), American trumpeter
Zoltán Felvinczi Takác  (1880–1964), Hungarian art historians
 Zoltán Takács (musician) (born 1980), Hungarian musician and record producer
 Zoltán Takács (footballer) (born 1983), Hungarian footballer
 Zoltán Takács (toxinologist), Hungarian-born toxinologist and tropical adventurer

See also
Takács Quartet
Takácsi
Tkaczew
Tkalec

Hungarian words and phrases
Hungarian-language surnames
Occupational surnames